Glyphipterix gemmatella is a moth in the family Glyphipterigidae. It is known from the Republic of Congo and Sierra Leone.

References

Glyphipterigidae
Moths of Africa
Fauna of the Republic of the Congo
Moths described in 1864